The 2010 Damallsvenskan was the 23rd season of the Damallsvenskan, the highest level of women's football in Sweden. The season ran from 3 April to 16 October, the second-latest start to a season ever. Linköpings FC were the reigning champions, but the former Swedish champions Jitex were back after three years away. Tyresö FF were promoted from the 1st division North, and played in the Damallsvenskan for the first time since 1999.

LdB FC from Malmö secured the title with three of the 22 games to play, after a 1–1 draw with Kopparbergs/Göteborg FC. This was the first title for Malmö since 1994. LdB FC won 18 of their first 20 games in an incredible season, and with 59 points, had the best season for any club since Umeå IK in 2007. Dutch Manon Melis was the top scorer with 25 goals for the Malmö club, and they also signed Icelandic keeper Þóra Helgadóttir from Kolbotn and Australian-New Zealand Kathryn Gill from Sunnanå. Kopparbergs/Göteborg finished second, their best finish at the time, and also qualified for the Champions' League. 

The newly promoted teams performed strongly; Tyresö finished fourth, and Jitex finished sixth. This was the first time since the 1992 Damallsvenskan that a newly promoted team finished in the top four, and the first time ever that two newly promoted teams finished in the top six. 

At the other end of the table, AIK were relegated after four seasons in the Damallsvenskan. Two teams with a long history in the Damallsvenskan fought over the other relegation spot; in the last match, Hammarby won and therefore moved above Sunnanå in the table, meaning that two Stockholm teams went down. Sunnanå SK were relegated to the first division for the first time since 2000.

Table

References

Damallsvenskan seasons
2010 in association football
2010 in Swedish women's football